Jonas Vaitkus (born 20 May 1944 in Lithuania) is a lecturer, theatre and film director. From 1969 to 1974 Jonas Vaitkus studied at the State Theatre, Music and Cinematography Institute of Leningrad (Saint Petersburg). From 1977 to 1988 he was the artistic director of Kaunas State (Academic) Drama Theater, and from 1989 to 1995 was the artistic director of the Lithuanian National Drama Theatre.

A winner of various awards throughout his career, Jonas Vaitkus has directed many films and more than 60 plays. 

Jonas Vaitkus has mentored a number of actors and directors, including director Oskaras Koršunovas and actress Ingeborga Dapkūnaitė, both of whom are well known internationally.

In February 2018 following the worldwide spread of the Me Too movement Vaitkus was publicly accused of sexual harassment or assault by some of his former students. He has denied the allegations claiming instead that this is a defamation campaign carried out by Russian propaganda.

Partial filmography
Utterly Alone aka Vienui vieni (2004)
A Thrush, a Green Bird aka Drozd - ptakha zelyonaya (1990)

Awards and nominations

References

  PERSONALIJA -Jonas VAITKUS. Lithuanian National Drama Theatre.

1944 births
Living people
Lithuanian theatre directors
Lithuanian film directors
Recipients of the Lithuanian National Prize